Pheasant Island may refer to:

 Pheasant Island, an island in the Bidasoa river owned jointly by Spain and France
 Pheasant Island (Eutin), an island in the Großer Eutiner See in Schleswig-Holstein, Germany